Johannes Anton Ullrich (1826–1895) was a German industrialist, inventor, and co-founder of the "Gebrüder Ullrich" in the Rhineland-Palatinate.

Life

Anton Ullrich was born on the 30 August 1826 in the small village of Maikammer, Germany.  He was the youngest son of an international merchant, Leonhard Ullrich, and his wife Regina Damm. Anton Ullrich worked in his father's store, before founding the "Gebrüder Ullrich" with his younger brother Franz Ullrich.  In 1851 Anton Ullrich invented the folding ruler, and in 1887 obtained the patent for the springed hinge of the folding ruler. The "Gebrüder Ullrich" company expanded quickly and later built another factory site in the neighbouring village of Kirrweiler.

Factory sites

 Annweiler am Trifels, Germany
 Bellheim, Germany
 Châlons sur Marne, France
 Kirrweiler, Germany
 Maikammer, Germany
 Schifferstadt, Germany

External links
"Gebrüder Ullrich" Memorial Maikammer memorial to the "Gebrüder Ullrich" (In German)
Stabila Brief history of the Stabila Company
History of Stabila (In German)

References

Publications

1826 births
1895 deaths
19th-century German businesspeople
19th-century German inventors